People v. Freeman was a criminal prosecution of Harold Freeman, a producer and director of pornographic films, by the U.S. state of California.  Freeman was charged in 1987 with pandering - procurement of persons "for the purpose of prostitution" - under section 266i of the Cal. Penal Code for hiring adult actors, which the prosecution characterized as pimping. The prosecution was part of an attempt by California to shut down the pornographic film industry. The prosecution's characterization was ultimately rejected on appeal by the California Supreme Court.  Prior to this decision, pornographic films had often been shot in secret locations.

Freeman was initially convicted, and lost on appeal to the California Court of Appeal.  The trial judge, however, thought jail would be an unreasonably harsh penalty for Freeman's conduct, and sentenced him to probation, despite the fact that this was explicitly contrary to the statute.  The State appealed this sentence but lost.

Freeman appealed to the California Supreme Court, which subsequently overturned his conviction, finding that the California pandering statute was not intended to cover the hiring of actors who would be engaging in sexually explicit but non-obscene performances.  Freeman could only have been lawfully convicted of pandering if he had paid the actors for the purpose of sexually gratifying himself or the actors.  The court relied upon the language of the statute for this interpretation, as well as the need to avoid a conflict with the First Amendment right to free speech.  The court viewed Freeman's conviction as "a somewhat transparent attempt at an 'end run' around the First Amendment and the state obscenity laws."

The State of California unsuccessfully tried to have this judgment overturned by the United States Supreme Court. Justice Sandra Day O'Connor denied a stay of the California Supreme Court's judgment, while being critical of its First Amendment reasoning noting "it must certainly be true that otherwise illegal conduct is not made legal by being filmed" she found it unlikely the petition for certiorari would be granted because the California Supreme Court's ruling was founded on an adequate and independent basis of state law. The full Court subsequently denied the petition for certiorari.

As a result, the making of hardcore pornography was effectively legalized in California.

In 2008, in the case of New Hampshire v. Theriault, the New Hampshire Supreme Court adopted the distinction between pornography production and prostitution in their interpretation of The New Hampshire Constitutions' free speech clause.

See also
 List of United States Supreme Court cases, volume 488
 List of United States Supreme Court cases
 Lists of United States Supreme Court cases by volume
 List of United States Supreme Court cases by the Rehnquist Court

References

Cases
 People v. Freeman, 46 Cal.3d 419 (1988)
 California v. Freeman, 488 U.S. 1311 (1989)
 New Hampshire v. Theriault (2008)

External links 
 An article on the Freeman case
 RAME FAQ entry on the Freeman case

California state case law
United States Free Speech Clause case law
United States pornography law
1988 in United States case law
1988 in California